Margaret Lowrie Robertson was an International Correspondent at CNN from 1989 to 2002. She joined the network in September 1989 and contributed extensively to coverage of the Gulf War from Baghdad, one of the first female TV news reporters to broadcast live from Iraq during the conflict. She was made an international correspondent in 1993 and was based in London for nearly a decade. From 1985 to 1988, she worked for CBS News in Cairo. Before that, she worked as a freelance radio correspondent for CBS in Beirut and National Public Radio in Poland during the Solidarity era. She began her career as a copy-person at the New York Times in 1978 and was a news assistant in the Times' United Nations Bureau from 1979 to 1982. Raised in Charlottesville, VA, Lowrie is a graduate of Boston University. She is married to CNN Senior International correspondent Nic Robertson They have two daughters  and live in London.
Her novel, Season of Betrayal, set in Beirut 1983, was first published in hardback by Tatra Press in October 2006 and was released by Harcourt as a Harvest trade paperback in October 2007.

External links
 mlrobertson.com

American television reporters and correspondents
Boston University alumni
Living people
CNN people
American women journalists
Year of birth missing (living people)
21st-century American women